The Welsh Football Writers' Association (the WFWA) is an association of Welsh football journalists and correspondents writing for newspapers, websites and agencies. Along with writers for newspapers, magazines, websites and agencies, football broadcasters, photographers and other journalists are also welcome to join the association.

See also
Scottish Football Writers' Association
Football Writers Association
 WFWA (disambiguation)

External links
Official website

United Kingdom journalism organisations
Football mass media in the United Kingdom
Football in Wales
Football organisations in Wales
Sports journalism organizations in Europe
Professional associations based in the United Kingdom